William Boyce Baggett (June 2, 1929 – May 20, 2015) was a professional football player who played in the National Football League (NFL) in 1952 for the Dallas Texans. Prior to playing professionally, Baggett played college football at Louisiana State University. In 1951, he played in the Blue–Gray Football Classic. During the 1951 NFL Draft, Baggett was drafted in the 22nd, 265 overall, by the Los Angeles Rams. However, he never played with the team.

Baggett died on May 20, 2015.

Notes

1929 births
2015 deaths
People from Greenville, Texas
Players of American football from Texas
American football halfbacks
LSU Tigers football players
Dallas Texans (NFL) players